Yli-Ii was a municipality of Finland. It was located in the province of Oulu and was part of the Northern Ostrobothnia region. Alongside Haukipudas, Kiiminki and Oulunsalo municipalities it was merged with the city of Oulu on 1 January 2013.

The municipality was unilingually Finnish.

Yli-Ii is probably best known from a pre-historical museum called Kierikkikeskus.

References

External links

 Municipality of Yli-Ii – Official site 

Municipalities of North Ostrobothnia
Populated places established in 1924
Former municipalities of Finland
Yli-Ii
1924 establishments in Finland